Preah Roka Wildlife Sanctuary is a  protected area in Preah Vihear Province of Cambodia. There are 41 communities in the protected areas within Preah Vihear province.  The stated purpose of its creation in 2016 was to:

 Ensure protection of wildlife habitat and ecology system and satisfy condition for particular species of flora and fauna and biodiversity
 Deliver natural products and services for sustainable use
 Promote local communities and public-based national resource management and biodiversity protection within the area.

The area is threatened by illegal logging. The area is used by the Kuy ethnic minority for resin collection and other non-timber forest products, and members of the Prey Preah Roka Forest Community Network work together with government rangers from the Ministry of Environment, supported by the Wildlife Conservation Society to protected the site.

References 

Wildlife sanctuaries of Cambodia
Protected areas of Cambodia
2016 establishments in Cambodia